Sami Shah (born 24 August 1978) is a Pakistani-Australian stand-up comedian, writer, improvisational actor, and radio presenter. Shah was a member of the improvisational comedy group "BlackFish" created by Saad Haroon in 2002, and later performed the first solo English-language comedy show in Pakistan. He had several tours across Pakistan.

He moved to Australia in 2012, and has since hosted several podcasts and shows on ABC radio as well as writing several books, performing in comedy festivals and participating in the Jaipur Literature Festival in Adelaide. He has appeared on television in Australia, Pakistan and the United Kingdom.

Early life and education
Born in Pakistan to a moderate Muslim family, Shah studied English at the University of Virginia in the US. For a while after the September 11 attacks in 2001 he was drawn into Islam, partly as a reaction to its persecution and also because of his opposition to the invasion of Iraq. He moved back to Pakistan in 2002 and gradually rejected all religion and openly embraced atheism.

Career in Pakistan

Stand-up
Shah joined BlackFish, a comedy troupe created by Saad Haroon, in 2003. The group of eight comics employed improvisational theatre as well as scripts, using a repertoire of characters created by each of them and performing 50 times in 2003. In 2004 they performed in the UK, representing Pakistan as part of a British Council "Connecting Futures Project". Shah co-wrote We’ve Made Contact, a half-improvised half-scripted original format play for the performance in Manchester. He remained an active member until the troupe disbanded in 2006.

Shah performed his first solo show in Karachi on 13 November 2005. Entitled "Nobody Moves, Nobody Gets Hurt", it raised funds for victims of the 2005 earthquake. In 2006, he toured Pakistan with fellow comics Haroon and Danish Ali, in what came to be called the 3-4-5 Tour. His 2007 solo Karachi show spared nobody, aiming at mullahs, Pakistani culture, advertising agencies, local and international politics and various groups of people.

In 2008, Shah hosted, wrote, produced and directed a news satire television show, News Weakly. It ran for two seasons on the 24-hour news channel Dawn News and won acclaim both locally and internationally.

He later said that the government's strict blasphemy laws, incurring the death penalty, affected the content of his performances; after being accused of blasphemy by an audience member after his first stand-up gig, he never again mentioned religion while performing in Pakistan.

Writing
Shah wrote for Pakistani magazines and was a columnist for The Express Tribune in 2012. His regular contributions as a music critic resulted in him being a judge for the prestigious Lux Style Awards in 2006.

Australia

Personal
Shah and his wife, psychologist Ishma Alvi, moved to Australia with their young daughter in 2012, partly because of the lack of freedom allowed to women and girls in Pakistan. After spending some years in the small town of Northam, WA, they moved to Melbourne in 2015. They became Australian citizens in January 2017. The couple divorced in 2017. In 2019, Shah remarried, although the second marriage only lasted a few months after his wife had an affair. 

Although an atheist, Shah has self-identified as a "cultural Muslim", saying that it's part of his background and he loves it. He also describes himself as a "serial blasphemer", and embraces the freedom he has in Australia "to talk openly about the major issues that need to be addressed in Islam".

Stand-up
When in Western Australia, Shah travelled around the state doing comedy gigs, and he later made a name for himself poking fun at his adopted town at the biggest comedy festivals in the country.

In 2013 he won Best Local Act at the Perth International Comedy Festival and in 2016 Best Comedy WA 2016 Fringe World. He appeared at the 2019 Melbourne International Comedy Festival.

Speaking engagements
In January 2014, Shah gave a talk at TedX in Melbourne entitled "The Unseen Laugh", in which he talks about some of his experiences in Pakistan and Western Australia, Australian attitudes towards asylum seekers, and using comedy to change people's perspectives.

In November 2019, Shah will be a presenter and participant in panel discussions at "JLF in Adelaide", the first time that the Jaipur Literary Festival had been presented in Australia.

Writing
In July 2014, he published an autobiography entitled I, Migrant: A Comedian's Journey from Karachi to the Outback, which was shortlisted for the 2015 New South Wales Premier's Literary Awards NSW Multicultural Award as well as the Russell Prize for Humour Writing.

In 2016 he published his first foray into young adult fiction, Fire Boy, with its sequel Earth Boy released in 2017.

In July 2017, The Islamic Republic of Australia was published. It seeks to dispel the myth that there is a single monolithic entity representing a typical Muslim in Australia, and attempts to describe the many types of Muslims, who differ in nationality of origin, the type of Islam they practise and individual personalities. He talked to academics, Islamic leaders and public figures when researching the book. Written in a humorous style, it has chapters named  "How to blaspheme" and "Apostates are people too".

Radio and TV

Radio
In 2015, Shah wrote and presented a two-episode series for BBC Radio 4, entitled "Sami Shah's Beginner's Guide to Pakistan", examining Pakistan's political history.

In July–August 2016, Shah wrote and presented a five-part series for ABC Radio National (RN) called "The Islamic Republic of Australia", examining the role of Islam in contemporary Australia. In it, he discussed topics like radicalisation, free speech and the hijab with moderate Muslims, Islamic preachers, ex-Muslims and Islamophobes. In 2017, Richard Fidler presented a four-part "bonus" series on his Conversations radio program.

In July 2016 Sami became the ABC Radio Melbourne field and social media reporter.

As part of the ABC First Run initiative to produce comedy podcast programs, Shah was commissioned to host a new show called Laughing Dead. He invites comedians to talk about their worst performance experience. Notable guests on the show include Maz Jobrani, Andy Kindler, Claire Hooper, Alexei Sayle and Luke McGregor. The program was produced and edited by Courtney Carthy and broadcast from 5 October 2016.

In December 2017, Shah was announced as a co-host of Breakfast with Jacinta Parsons on ABC Radio Melbourne, replacing Red Symons.

In April 2019, as part of ABC RN's Earshot program, Shah presented Shutup: A free speech investigation, in which he investigates the concept and practice of all aspects of free speech in Australia and explores the nature of a double standard. In one episode, he speaks of the fear he felt of a possible fatwa being issued against him as an apostate, or being pursued by extremist ISIS supporters, likening it to fear felt by certain individuals in minority groups in Australia who have been hounded in the media by right-wing commentators and politicians and on social media by internet trolls, or even persecuted by death threats. Citing the case of Yassmin Abdel-Magied, he says that most people of colour and Muslims in the public eye have either had experience of, or a fear of "getting Yassmined", and that women in general experience this more than men. In two bonus episodes, he talks to conservative commentator Andrew Bolt and lawyer and anti-racism advocate Nyadol Nyuon.

TV
Shah was on the jury for music nominations on the Pakistan Lux Style Awards TV Special 2006 and 2007 TV Special (filmed in Malaysia), and as host in 2010.

In 2015, he appeared on the BBC Two TV panel show QI, in episode 3 (M-places) and in the compilation episode 18.

In September 2017, he appeared in season 1, episode 2 of Australian comedy show Get Krack!n on ABC TV.

From October 2017, Shah was a regular panellist on the Australian TV show Screen Time on ABC TV, discussing film, television and online content.

Works

See also 
 List of Lollywood actors

References

Further reading & viewing

YouTube videos of stand-up routines

External links

Australian atheists
Australian music critics
Pakistani music critics
Living people
Australian writers of Pakistani descent
Pakistani atheists
Pakistani emigrants to Australia
Australian stand-up comedians
Pakistani stand-up comedians
Australian memoirists
Australian radio personalities
1978 births